Tapilula is a town and one of the 119 Municipalities of Chiapas, in southern Mexico.

As of 2010, the municipality had a total population of 12,170, up from 10,349 as of 2005. It covers an area of 126.7 km².

As of 2010, the town of Tapilula had a population of 7,441. Other than the town of Tapilula, the municipality had 50 localities, the largest of which (with 2010 populations in parentheses) was: San Francisco Jaconá (1,323), classified as rural.

References

Municipalities of Chiapas